Philippa Claire Tarrant (born 7 December 1977) is a British radio producer, presenter, and book author. She works as Executive Producer on the Chris Moyles Breakfast show on Radio X since the show started on 21 September 2015. Previously she has worked as a producer for BBC Radio 1, again with The Chris Moyles Show.

Taylor has run the London marathon and in doing so raised a total of £27,711.34 for the Global Make Some Noise charity.

Taylor has been dating Toby Tarrant, son of presenter Chris Tarrant since July 2017. The couple moved in together mid 2018. Pippa announced their engagement on The Chris Moyles Show on 20 July 2020. The couple married on 16 September 2022.

Taylor's mother, Diane, is a councillor on Basingstoke and Deane council and holds the title of Mayor, opening Basingstoke Wickes as her first official engagement. She is also Chair of the Licensing committee. Diane Taylor was due to be made Mayor of Basingstoke and Deane in May 2019.

References

External links

Living people
British radio producers
Women radio producers
People from Brighton
1977 births